AAHA or Aaha may refer to:

Organizations
 All American Hockey League (2008–2011), formerly the All American Hockey Association
 American Amputee Hockey Association, also an ice hockey league in the U.S.
 American Animal Hospital Association
 the former Alberta Amateur Hockey Association, now known as Hockey Alberta

Film and television
Aahaa..! (1997 film), a Tamil language film
Aahaa..! (1998 film), a Telugu language film
Aaha (2021 film), a Malayalam language film
Aaha (TV series), a 2011-12 Tamil series